Thomas Haskell may refer to:

 Thomas Haskell (historian) (1939–2017), American historian
 Thomas Haskell (journalist) (1833–1928), American journalist
 Thomas H. Haskell (1842–1900), Justice of the Maine Supreme Judicial Court